Lisa Lage is an American rock climber who focused on competitive indoor rock climbing from 1997 to 2002.  She is a five time Youth National Champion and a member of the US Youth Climbing Team for six consecutive years.

Lage joined the Junior Competition Climbing Association (JCCA) and won at the Youth Nationals becoming National Champion in the 12- to 13-year-old girl's division.  That same year Lage attended the Youth Worlds and World Cup in Imst, Austria, but was unable to compete because she was too young.  Her father's US Air Force career moved her family to Pope Air Force Base, NC.  After another undefeated JCCA season, Lage took second place at the Youth Nationals for the 14- to 15-year-old girl's division.

Lage began assistant coaching, with Lesley Pearson, a youth climbing team at her local gym, The Climbing Place, NC  She also had the opportunity to give a climbing demo to the 6th, 7th, and 8th grade classes at Pierce Middle School in Pennsylvania. She was also the head route setter for an ASCF competition at The Climbing Place.

In 1999, Lage had  11 wins in the JCCA season, including the National Championship.  She ranked 26th place at the World Youth Championship in Courmayeur, Italy, after her foot slipped on the second preliminary climb.  In 2000 after an undefeated JCCA season, Lage becoming National Champion for the third time.  She placed 13th at the Youth Worlds in Amsterdam, Netherlands.  In 2001, Lage completed another undefeated JCCA season, winning both the National Championship and the Continental Championship. Lage also claimed a third-place finish at the European Youth Cup in Trieste, Italy.  She competed in Austria, France, Italy, Switzerland, and Slovenia on the Difficulty World Cup tour.

The 2002 season was Lage's final one.  As an undefeated National Champion, she took 5th for difficulty and 14th for speed at the Youth World Championship in Canteleu, France.  She completed a third Difficulty World Cup season, traveling to Russia, Singapore, Italy, and Austria.  Lage's overall world ranking for 2002 was 28th.  After the season finished, Lage decided to return to the United States to pursue her degree from Philadelphia Biblical University now Cairn University in Bible and Discipleship Counseling.

Competition results

1997 competition results

 member of 1997 US Youth Climbing Team

1998 competition results

 member of 1998 US Youth Climbing Team

1999 competition results

 member of the 1999 US Youth Climbing Team

2000 competition results

 Member of 2000 US Youth Climbing Team, US Difficulty Climbing A Team, US Bouldering B Team

2001 competition results

 member of 2001 US Youth Climbing Team

2002 competition results

 member of the 2002 US Youth Climbing Team

References

Living people
Year of birth missing (living people)